Novomoskovsky District  is an administrative district (raion), one of the twenty-three in Tula Oblast, Russia. Within the framework of municipal divisions, it is incorporated as Novomoskovsk Urban Okrug. It is located in the east of the oblast. Its administrative center is the city of Novomoskovsk. Population: 143,848 (2010 Census);  The population of Novomoskovsk accounts for 91.3% of the district's total population.

References

Notes

Sources

Districts of Tula Oblast